Sam Green was an openly gay psychiatric nurse and Liberal politician who was elected as a member of Durham City Council in 1972. He has been described as the first openly gay councillor in England and first openly gay candidate in an election in Britain.

Political career 

Green was aged 31 at the time of his election to the Crossgate seat, and had stood for election to the council twice before. During the campaign he openly identified himself as gay and as a member of the Gay Liberation Front, and in an interview with Gay News he reported that his sexuality had been extensively covered in the press and had attracted negative comments from opponents. He was elected to the seat, ousting an 18-year incumbent councillor.

As one of his actions as a councillor, he asked for Gay News to be stocked in the city's libraries.

Green retained his seat in the 1973 and 1976 local elections, but did not stand in the 1979 elections (when the seat was incorporated into a larger Crossgate and Framwelgate ward).

World in Action documentary 

In 1973, as part of long-running series World in Action, ITV broadcast a 30-minute documentary about Green and his election to Durham council, entitled "Conversations with a Gay Liberal". Council colleagues opposed production of the documentary, and banned filming in the Durham council chambers.

The documentary was selected in 1974 to be preserved in the National Film Archive and was re-released on DVD in 2014 as part of World in Action: Volume 4.

See also 

 List of the first LGBT holders of political offices in the United Kingdom

References 

Councillors in County Durham
Gay Liberation Front members
English LGBT politicians
British LGBT rights activists
1940 births
Living people